SM U-23 was one of the 329 U-boats serving in the Imperial German Navy in World War I.

U-23 was engaged in the naval warfare and took part in the First Battle of the Atlantic.

Twenty four men died and 10 survived.

Summary of raiding history

References

Notes

Citations

Bibliography

World War I submarines of Germany
Maritime incidents in 1915
U-boats sunk in 1915
1912 ships
Ships built in Kiel
U-boats sunk by British submarines
Type U 23 submarines
U-boats commissioned in 1913
World War I shipwrecks in the Atlantic Ocean
Shipwrecks of Scotland
1915 in Scotland
Fair Isle
History of Shetland